Thailand competed at the 1996 Summer Olympics in Atlanta, United States. Thailand won its first ever gold medal during this Olympics, making it the second Southeast Asian country to win gold.

Medalists

Results by event

Athletics

Men's 4 × 100 metres Relay
Sayan Namwong, Worasit Vechaphut, Kongdech Natenee, and Ekkachai Janthana

Women's 4 × 100 metres Relay
Sunisa Kawrungruang, Kwuanfah Inchareon, Savitree Srichure, and Supaporn Hubson

Badminton

Men

Women

Boxing

Diving

Men

Women

Sailing

Men

Shooting

Men

Women

Swimming

Men

Women

Table tennis

Tennis

Women

Weightlifting

Men

References
Official Olympic Reports
International Olympic Committee results database
 sports-reference

Nations at the 1996 Summer Olympics
1996 Summer Olympics
Summer Olympics